Cornerstone Community Church (Abbreviation: CSCC) is an independent, Charismatic church based in Singapore. It is committed to global missions and has affiliate congregations in Kenya, Uganda, Myanmar, Pakistan, Indonesia, Australia and the Philippines. Established in 1990, the church is led by founder and senior pastor Rev. Yang Tuck Yoong.

History
Cornerstone Community Church, previously known as Bedok Christian Centre, was established in 1990 under the umbrella of the Anglican Church in Singapore. On January 1, 1994, it was renamed Cornerstone Community Church to better reflect the growing diversity of the congregation. On June 2, 1995, CSCC became an independent Charismatic church to further facilitate the spiritual calling of the parishioners. In mid-2000, the church became officially affiliated with Zion Ministerial Fellowship Inc., a ministerial fellowship based in Waverly, New York, United States.

Over the years, Cornerstone Community Church has grown to more than 5,000 members comprising ten congregations of various nationalities and languages. It has also set up bible schools and planted over a 100 churches in 18 different countries. This includes Generations, their youth service. In 2012, CSCC helped to revitalise  Bible College of Wales
and the Pisgah Chapel  in Swansea, Wales, an institution that intercessor, Rees Howells established in 1927.

Cell groups
Cell groups are a fundamental part of Cornerstone Community Church. The purpose of the cell groups is to be a setting for relational connectedness where the love of Christ is experienced in a personal way through friendship, care, encouragement, and expressions of love and kindness. It is also intended to be a place to grow, where every believer can develop and use their God-given abilities to help others and to engage in body ministry in the most powerful way.

Missions 
Cornerstone Community Church believes it has been called by God to be a house of prayer and to fulfil the Great Commission. Since its inception, the church has dispatched many teams overseas to proclaim the gospel. Today, CSCC has church plants in almost  a dozen countries.

Controversies

Comments on homosexuality
Rev. Yang was in the news after an article entitled "Gay Backlash" was published in The Straits Times on July 23, 2003.

The article summarised the different views of Christian organisations in Singapore regarding the remarks made by then-Singaporean Prime Minister Goh Chok Tong, in which he announced the government's openness to the employment of homosexuals, despite homosexual acts still being illegal in Singapore. The article reported that Rev. Yang, together with a group of Christians, voluntary organisations and professions, met to discuss a strategy and plan of action for Christians to tackle what they termed as a "volatile situation."

In September 2003, Rev. Yang issued a statement to Time magazine whereby he accused the American publication of glamourizing an illegal and condemned lifestyle in an article which reviewed the gay scene in Singapore. He added that the people of Singapore have spoken up against the subject. No attestation, however, was provided by Rev. Yang with regard to this claim.

On February 24, 2008, Rev. Yang gave a sermon entitled "The Sin of Sodom" in which he called homosexuality an abomination. He argued that homosexuality is a spirit that is yet to prevail in Singapore because of official legislation, public opinion and conscience. He persuaded churches to stand up and oppose this "spirit," before Singapore is sent to the abyss in the same manner as Sodom. He also encouraged churches to be "bold" and "courageous," and to "take a stand." He lamented that a church that has lost the ability to influence and lobby society would be useless.

Comments on Myanmar floods in 2008
In May 2008, Rev. Yang commented in an article published in The Christian Post that he understood the 2008 Myanmar floods, caused by Cyclone Nargis, to be the "Hand of God” to teach the nations righteousness. Contrary to published sources, Rev. Yang encouraged his readers to view the floods as a warning that the end “draweth nigh”.

Comments on Kong Hee and the City Harvest Church corruption case
Following the conviction of Rev. Kong Hee and five other co-conspirators in the City Harvest Church criminal breach of trust case, Singapore's biggest case in misuse of charitable funds, Rev. Yang wrote in a post on the church's website, describing the saga as having "brought incredible reproach to the Lord" and "given many people an opportunity to profane the Name of the Lord". He described Kong Hee as having "lost everything he worked so hard for, his whole life" after failing to "take heed to the proverb that says a good name is to be chosen rather than great riches".

Having both served as youth leaders in the Marine Parade Christian Centre in the early 1980s, Yang described Kong as "ambitious, highly-driven and very charismatic". Friction between the pair eventually led them to go on separate paths. "Through the years, a few things started happening and it was becoming increasingly uncomfortable for the both of us," Yang wrote. "We had very different worldview, styles and personality, and to prevent any sort of split, we made a decision to multiply the youth ministry, one under Kong and one under me."

Anti-Muslim remarks by American preacher Lou Engle
In March 2018, remarks by fundamentalist American preacher Lou Engle that were made at a three-day conference organised by Cornerstone created an uproar. Engle had addressed thousands attending the conference, saying, “The Muslims are taking over the south of Spain. But I had a dream, where I will raise up the church all over Spain to push back a new modern Muslim movement.”

The church filed a police report against Rice Media, the online news startup that first reported the remarks. The church said the article was a “scurrilous attack” and that it had a “seditious tendency”. It also said the article contained serious allegations "that seek to, and has the effect of, stirring up religious tensions and promoting feelings of ill-will and hostility between Christians and Muslims".

Senior pastor Yang Tuck Yoong later said Engle's remarks were "never meant to be an indictment against Muslims or the Muslim community in Spain as a whole. Instead, he was referring to the radical Islamic insurgency, including ISIS (Islamic State in Iraq and Syria) advances into that nation with intentions of pressing its brand of militant ideology. He expressed his apologies that the choice of words used might have caused unnecessary misunderstandings, as it had not been in his intention to do so." Engle did not comply with a request by the police department to return to Singapore to cooperate with investigations.

Yang later met with the Mufti of Singapore and other Muslim community leaders to offer an apology. He said the church was unaware of Engle's controversial past and informed him that he would not be able to speak in Singapore in future.

At an interfaith visit with a mosque months later, Yang said the church had tightened protocols and procedures to ensure "something like this never happens again".

See also

 Megachurch
 Bible College of Wales
 Christianity in Singapore
 Section 377A of the Penal Code (Singapore)

References

News articles

External links
Cornerstone Community Church website
Trinity School of Ministry

1990 establishments in Singapore
Churches in Singapore